Nykvarn Municipality (Nykvarns kommun) is a municipality in Stockholm County in east central Sweden. Its seat is located in the town of Nykvarn.

Nykvarn is a young municipality, and is the result of the splitting of Södertälje Municipality in 1999. Nykvarn can be regarded as a totally new municipality, because there was never before an entity with that territory or that name.

The municipality has a significant population increase in the summer thanks to tourism.

Nykvarn is located between the two cities Södertälje and Strängnäs, and many citizens of Nykvarn work in either.

Archeological finds show the area to have been inhabited for about 5,000 years, similar to its neighbouring municipalities around Lake Mälaren.

Besides graves from the Stone Age, there is also an interesting runestone that can be visited that is listed in the Rundata catalog as Sö 338. It currently resides in the Turinge church, a church that has a history dating back to around the year 1100. This runestone has a very long inscription.

A newer sight is the Taxinge-Näsby Castle, which was begun sometime in or before the 14th century, by Bo Jonsson Grip. The castle has its current facade in the empire style from 1813. Many celebrities have during the centuries visited or stayed at the castle, including Carl Michael Bellman in the 18th century and August Strindberg in the 19th century.

Demography

Population development

Residents with a foreign background 
On 31 December 2017 the number of people with a foreign background (persons born outside of Sweden or with two parents born outside of Sweden) was 1 821, or 17.08% of the population (10 660 on 31 December 2017). On 31 December 2002 the number of residents with a foreign background was (per the same definition) 1 243, or 15.15% of the population (8 204 on 31 December 2002). On 31 December 2017 there were 10 660 residents in Nykvarn, of which 1 290 people (12.10%) were born in a country other than Sweden. Divided by country in the table below - the Nordic countries as well as the 12 most common countries of birth outside of Sweden for Swedish residents have been included, with other countries of birth bundled together by continent by Statistics Sweden.

Elections

Riksdag
These are the results of the Riksdag elections of Nykvarn Municipality since the founding of the modern municipality from the 1998 election. The results of the Sweden Democrats were not published by SCB between 1988 and 1998 at a municipal level to the party's small nationwide size at the time. "Votes" denotes valid votes, whereas "Turnout" denotes also blank and invalid votes.

Blocs

This lists the relative strength of the socialist and centre-right blocs since 1973, but parties not elected to the Riksdag are inserted as "other", including the Sweden Democrats results from 1988 to 2006, but also the Christian Democrats pre-1991 and the Greens in 1982, 1985 and 1991. The sources are identical to the table above. The coalition or government mandate marked in bold formed the government after the election. New Democracy got elected in 1991 but are still listed as "other" due to the short lifespan of the party. "Elected" is the total number of percentage points from the municipality that went to parties who were elected to the Riksdag.

References

External links 

Nykvarn Municipality - Official site

Municipalities of Stockholm County
1999 establishments in Sweden
States and territories established in 1999